Bliss and Other Stories is a 1920 collection of short stories by the writer Katherine Mansfield.

Stories 
 "Prelude" (1918)
 "Je ne parle pas français" (1917) (censored for collection; see article)
 "Bliss" (1918)
 "The Wind Blows" (1920)
 "Psychology" (1920)
 "Pictures" (1917) 
 "The Man Without a Temperament" (1920)
 "Mr Reginald Peacock's Day" (1920)
 "Sun and Moon" (1920)
 "Feuille d'Album" (1917)
 "A Dill Pickle" (1917)
 "The Little Governess" (1915) 
 "Revelations" (1920)
 "The Escape" (1920)

References  
Notes

Bibliography

External links 
 Bliss and other stories at the New Zealand Text Centre
 Bliss and Other Stories by Katherine Mansfield available at Project Gutenberg
 Bliss and Other Stories by Katherine Mansfield available at Project Gutenberg Australia

1920 short story collections
Short stories by Katherine Mansfield
New Zealand short story collections
Constable & Co. books